There are many known portraits of Charles Darwin.  Darwin came from a wealthy family and became a well-known naturalist and author, and portraits were made of him in childhood, adulthood and old age.  Darwin's life (1809–1882) spanned the development of photography, and early portraits of Darwin are drawn or painted, while many later portraits are monochrome photographs.  After the publication and dissemination of the controversial On the Origin of Species in 1859, Darwin was also the subject of numerous caricatures.

Darwin's visage, particularly his iconic beard, continues to be culturally significant and widely recognisable into the 21st century.  According to historian Janet Browne, Darwin's capacity to commission photographs of himself—and their widespread reproduction as carte de visite and cabinet card photographs—helped to cement the lasting connection between Darwin and the theory of evolution in popular thought (largely to the exclusion of the many others who also contributed to the development of evolutionary theory), especially as these portraits were reinterpreted in caricature.  At that time few could afford to commission portrait photographs, and this gave Darwin an advantage in gaining public recognition.

Especially in his last decades as his illness progressed, Darwin expressed frustration about sitting for photographs.  He turned down an opportunity in 1869 to sit for a portrait with Alfred Russel Wallace, explaining that sitting for photographs "is what I hate doing & wastes a whole day owing to my weak health; and to sit with another person would cause still more trouble & delay."  Nevertheless, there are at least 53 known photographs of Darwin, according to Gene Kritsky, a scholar of Darwin photos.


Chronological list of portraits

References

External links

Charles Robert Darwin – National Portrait Gallery, London
Photographs – The Complete Work of Charles Darwin Online
Darwiniana – Catalog of reproductions and derivatives of Darwin's image
Darwin portraits – University of Oklahoma Libraries, History of Science Collections
Charles Robert Darwin – Wellcome Images
"Evolutionists Flock To Darwin-Shaped Wall Stain", The Onion, 5 September 2008.

Charles Darwin
Darwin
Darwin
Darwin